Isidro Lángara Galarraga (25 May 1912 in Pasaia, Gipuzkoa – 21 August 1992 in Andoain) was a Spanish football striker from the Basque Country. He played 12 times for Spain, scoring 17 goals, and has the highest goal-ratio in La Liga at 1.14. He was also the first player to score at least 100 goals for three different clubs, being the only one to achieve it in three different continents.

Career
Lángara began his football career playing for local teams, Bildur Guchi, Esperanza de San Sebastián, Siempre Adelante de Pasajes and Andoain in his native Basque country, eventually signing for then third division team Tolosa CF. When he turned 18, his goalscoring abilities were recognized by second division team Real Oviedo, a club with whom he would remain for 6 years, until the Spanish Civil War broke out in 1936.

At Oviedo he was the figurehead of the celebrated Delantera Eléctrica ("The electric forwards"), a forward line of lightning quick youthful talent that steam-rolled teams with high tempo highly skilled play; but for the onset of war the team would have surely improved upon the two third places in the seasons that preceded the war.

He was the winner of the Pichichi Trophy, awarded to the top scorer in the Spanish League, in the three seasons before the war, with 27 goals in 1933–34, 26 goals in 1934–35 and 28 goals in 1935–36. Even before that he was top scorer in the Spanish second division the year Real Oviedo was promoted.

During his first spell in Oviedo, he is recognized to have scored 281 goals in 220 games, this includes 231 goals in 160 competitive games. In the season 1933–34 he scored an unprecedented 60 goals in 32 games for Oviedo and another 9 goals in 5 games for the Spanish national team, this is still the highest single season goalscoring count for any Spanish born footballer.

In December 1936, he played one match for Athletic Bilbao.

With the onset of war, he joined the Republican side. In 1937 he played exhibition games around Europe with the Basque National team to raise funds for the war effort.

When Bilbao fell to the falange, the team traveled to the Americas touring Cuba, Mexico and Argentina. In 1938 they joined the Mexican Liga Mayor under the name Euzkadi, finishing second. After the civil war ended in 1939 the team dissolved and Lángara traveled to Argentina in search of a new team, as a republican he could not return to Spain without risking harsh repression.

On the advice from his teammate Ángel Zubieta, he joined San Lorenzo de Almagro. His debut in 1939 was against perennial league champions River Plate and he scored 4 goals in a 4–2 victory, after arriving in Argentina on the morning of the same day. In 1940, Langara was the joint top scorer in the Argentine Primera with 33 goals in 34 games (his record in Argentina playing for San Lorenzo – 110 goals in 121 matches). He also holds the record of scoring most goals in a match in Argentina – 7 – that still stands today.

With Langara, San Lorenzo became an Argentine top side, eventually breaking the River Plate monopoly and winning the Argentinian league title. Lángara was San Lorenzo's star player alongside René Pontoni (courted by Barcelona but remained in Argentina) and Reinaldo Martino (who would later become a star with Juventus). Although he never won the league with San Lorenzo, the team finished twice in second place and won the Copa de Confraternidad Escobar – Gerona, an official trophy organized between the second placed teams from Argentina and Uruguay. With Lángara, San Lorenzo also reached the final of the Copa Adrián C. Escobar in 1939.

With the emergence of a professional league in Mexico in 1943, Langara signed to Real Club España, where he would win his first and only national league title. In the Mexican league he was top scorer twice, in 1944 and 1946. Still today, he is the only footballer in history to be top scorer in major leagues on three different continents; only Alfredo Di Stefano, Romário, Ruud van Nistelrooy and Cristiano Ronaldo have matched the feat of being top scorer in three separate countries. In 1946 he was awarded CONCACAF player of the year – the top player in all the northern and Central American leagues.

After many years abroad, Langara was offered the chance of returning to Spain to once again play for Real Oviedo. The following season, 1946–47 and back in Spain, he scored a respectable 18 goals for the team. This tally left him fourth, behind Zarra, Pruden and Calvo for the Pichichi Trophy, proving that at 34 years of age he could still perform at the highest level. At the end of the season, Langara stunned Oviedo by announcing his retirement and emigrating back to live in Mexico.

Retirement

After retirement, he spent the majority of his years in South America, returning to his home region in Spain in his late seventies, where he died in 1992.

His managerial career is sketchy but his achievements are as follows:

He managed Club de Deportes Unión Española in 1951 winning the Chilean league title.

He managed Puebla F.C. in 1952–53 winning the Mexican Cup Final.

About the footballer
As a footballer, Isidro Lángara was famed for his athleticism. Author of numerous "Impossible goals," he often scored from far out on the pitch. One particular famous occasion was on the opening matchday of the 1933–34 season when his Oviedo faced FC Barcelona winning the match 7–3. On that day, Lángara scored twice from set pieces around 50 metres out. When recounting the event, then Espanyol goalkeeper Lázaro Florenza noted "he scored an impossible goal, not once but twice". A few weeks later, Lázaro was himself victim of a similar free kick by Lángara. His physical stature was noted by teammates the day of his debut with San Lorenzo, when he was asked whether he was a footballer or a wrestler. At San Lorenzo, he became famous for his extremely powerful shot scoring often from long distance.

See also 
 List of men's footballers with 500 or more goals

References

External links 

 His goals scored in the Argentine league according to RSSSF.com
 His goals scored in the Mexican league according to RSSSF.com
 His goals scored in the Spanish league according to RSSSF.com
 

1912 births
1992 deaths
People from Pasaia
Sportspeople from Gipuzkoa
Footballers from the Basque Country (autonomous community)
Spanish footballers
Association football forwards
Real Oviedo players
C.D. Veracruz footballers
San Lorenzo de Almagro footballers
Real Club España footballers
La Liga players
Liga MX players
Argentine Primera División players
Spain international footballers
1934 FIFA World Cup players
Basque Country international footballers
Exiles of the Spanish Civil War in Mexico
Exiles of the Spanish Civil War in Argentina
Spanish expatriate footballers
Spanish expatriate sportspeople in Argentina
Spanish expatriate sportspeople in Mexico
Expatriate footballers in Mexico
Expatriate footballers in Argentina
Spanish football managers
Unión Española managers
Club Puebla managers
San Lorenzo de Almagro managers
Atlas F.C. managers
Chilean Primera División managers
Liga MX managers
Argentine Primera División managers
Spanish expatriate football managers
Spanish expatriate sportspeople in Chile
Expatriate football managers in Argentina
Expatriate football managers in Chile